Berytinus minor is a species of stilt bug in the family Berytidae. It is found in Africa, Europe and Northern Asia (excluding China), and North America.

Subspecies
These two subspecies belong to the species Berytinus minor:
 Berytinus minor hybridus (Horvath, 1891)
 Berytinus minor minor (Herrich-Schaeffer, 1835)

References

Further reading

External links

 

Berytidae
Articles created by Qbugbot
Insects described in 1835